The 1992 Family Circle Cup was a women's tennis tournament played on outdoor clay courts at the Sea Pines Plantation on Hilton Head Island, South Carolina in the United States and was part of Tier I of the 1992 WTA Tour. It was the 20th edition of the tournament and ran from March 30 through April 5, 1992. First-seeded Gabriela Sabatini won the singles title, her second consecutive title at the event.

Finals

Singles
 Gabriela Sabatini defeated  Conchita Martínez 6–1, 6–4
 It was Sabatini's 3rd singles title of the year and the 23rd of her career.

Doubles
 Arantxa Sánchez Vicario /  Natasha Zvereva defeated  Larisa Savchenko-Neiland /  Jana Novotná 6–4, 6–2
 It was Sánchez Vicario's 6th doubles title of the year and the 14th of her career. It was Zvereva's 2nd doubles title of the year and the 21st of her career.

References

External links
 Official website
 ITF tournament edition details
 1992 Main Draw

Family Circle Cup
Charleston Open
Family Circle Cup
Family Circle Cup
Family Circle Cup
Family Circle Cup